The 1986–87 Nationalliga A season was the 49th season of the Nationalliga A, the top level of ice hockey in Switzerland. 10 teams participated in the league, and HC Lugano won the championship.

Regular season

Playoffs

Semifinals 
 HC Lugano - HC Ambrì-Piotta 3:0 (5:4, 4:1, 7:1)
 EHC Kloten - HC Davos 3:2 (3:7, 2:5, 3:2, 5:1, 7:4)

3rd place
 HC Davos - HC Ambrì-Piotta 8:6/3:7

Final 
 HC Lugano - EHC Kloten 3:0 (6:2, 3:1, 4:0)

External links
 Championnat de Suisse 1986/87

Swiss
1986–87 in Swiss ice hockey